Cypert is an unincorporated community in Phillips County, Arkansas, United States.

The Turner Historic District, which is listed on the National Register of Historic Places, is located in Cypert.

References

Unincorporated communities in Phillips County, Arkansas
Unincorporated communities in Arkansas